Zhang Yan (born ) is a Chinese former women's football player.

She participated in the 1996 Summer Olympics.

References

External links
 

1972 births
Living people
Chinese women's footballers
Place of birth missing (living people)
1991 FIFA Women's World Cup players
China women's international footballers
Asian Games gold medalists for China
Asian Games medalists in football
Women's association football forwards
Footballers at the 1990 Asian Games
Medalists at the 1990 Asian Games